Ted Ellis Cohen (August 13, 1922 – October 17, 2002) was a politician in the American state of Florida. He served in the Florida House of Representatives from 1972 to 1974, representing the 102nd district.

References

1922 births
2002 deaths
Members of the Florida House of Representatives
20th-century American politicians